The men's triple jump event was part of the track and field athletics programme at the 1948 Summer Olympics. The competition was held on 3 August 1948. Twenty-eight athletes from 17 nations competed. The maximum number of athletes per nation had been set at 3 since the 1930 Olympic Congress. The final was won by Arne Åhman of Sweden. It was Sweden's first victory in the event since 1912, and first medal since 1932. Australia reached the podium for the second Games in a row (albeit twelve years apart) with Gordon George Avery's silver. Turkey received a medal in its first appearance in the triple jump with Ruhi Sarialp's bronze; it was the only track and field athletics medal won by Turkey in the 1900s.

Background

This was the 11th appearance of the event, which is one of 12 athletics events to have been held at every Summer Olympics. There were no returning jumpers from the pre-war 1936 Games. Japan had been dominant in the event before World War II, but was no longer. Valle Rautio of Finland was closest to being a favorite, having won the 1946 European championships.

Brazil, Ceylon, South Korea, Peru, Portugal, and Turkey each made their first appearance in the event. The United States competed for the 11th time, having competed at each of the Games so far.

Competition format

The competition used the two-round format introduced in 1936. In the qualifying round, each jumper received three attempts to reach the qualifying distance of 14.50 metres. Those who did advanced to the final round.

Records

Prior to the competition, the existing World and Olympic records were as follows.

No new world or Olympic records were set during the competition.

Schedule

All times are British Summer Time (UTC+1)

Results

Qualifying

Qual. rule: qualification standard 14.50 m (Q) or at least best 12 qualified (q).

Final

References

Sources
Organising Committee for the XIV Olympiad, The (1948). The Official Report of the Organising Committee for the XIV Olympiad. LA84 Foundation. Retrieved 5 September 2016.

Athletics at the 1948 Summer Olympics
Triple jump at the Olympics
Men's events at the 1948 Summer Olympics